Thomas Aaron Crean (born March 25, 1966) is a college basketball coach. Most recently, he was the head coach for the University of Georgia men's basketball team. Crean was previously the head coach of Indiana University. Prior to that, he served as head coach at Marquette University (1999–2008), where his team reached the 2003 NCAA Final Four.

Crean's basketball philosophy emphasizes fast breaks and transition offense. His guidance of the Indiana program to success from "unthinkable depths" was regarded as one of the most remarkable rebuilding projects in NCAA basketball history. In 2012, he was named the mid-season Jim Phelan National Coach of the Year, the Sporting News Big Ten Coach of the Year, and the ESPN.com National Coach of the Year. In 2016, Crean was named by the coaches and media the Big Ten Coach of the Year after coaching Indiana to their second outright Big Ten regular-season championship in four years.

Personal life
Crean was born and raised in Mount Pleasant, Michigan, where he played basketball for four years. According to Crean, "I didn't play a lot, although my coach called me his biggest tool, but I knew I wanted to coach."  While a student at Central Michigan University, Crean was an assistant coach at Mount Pleasant High School for five seasons, and at Alma College. Crean received his bachelor's degree in parks-and-recreation studies from Central Michigan in 1989.
Crean is married to Joani Harbaugh, whom he met while an assistant to Ralph Willard at Western Kentucky University (WKU) through a mutual friend, Ron Burns, at a gym where she was working as an aerobics instructor.  Her father, Jack Harbaugh, was the head football coach at WKU at the time Crean was an assistant basketball coach there. She is also the sister of the first pair of brothers in NFL history to serve as head coaches: Baltimore Ravens head football coach John Harbaugh and former San Francisco 49ers head football coach and current University of Michigan Wolverines  head football coach Jim Harbaugh. Crean and his wife have three children: Megan, Riley, and Ainsley. Riley was a right handed pitcher for the Georgia Bulldogs baseball team in 2019.  Crean is a Christian.

Assistant coaching career
Crean spent two stints at Michigan State, first during the 1989-1990 season as a graduate assistant under then head coach Jud Heathcote at the behest of then assistant coach Tom Izzo, whom Crean had befriended on the summer camp circuit. From 1990 to 1994 Crean served as the associate head coach under Ralph Willard at Western Kentucky. When Willard left Western Kentucky to become head coach at Pittsburgh in 1994, Crean was considered to replace him as head coach. Ultimately Crean followed Willard to Pittsburgh, serving as associate head coach for one year.

In 1995, Crean returned to Michigan State as assistant coach under the leadership of Tom Izzo. Izzo and Crean became such good friends that Crean lived in Izzo's house and Izzo was an usher in Crean's wedding. According to Crean at the time, "It was a great opportunity for me to go back home. We've been friends a long time. I don't think I would have left Ralph for anything else." During this period Crean served at various times as recruiting coordinator and, for the last two seasons, associate head coach. In each of Crean's four seasons, Michigan State's win total increased, culminating with a 33-5 season and a 15-1 Big Ten ledger in 1999. Michigan State later went on to honor Crean with a 2000 National Championship ring; even though he wasn't on the staff at the time, he'd helped recruit and develop many of the players on the title team.

Marquette University

On March 30, 1999, Crean was named head coach at Marquette University. According to Crean, "Once Marquette became available, that's where my sights were. I had unbelievable respect for the tradition and the name. When I thought of Marquette, I thought of a true basketball school and to me that had a lot to do with it." Crean immediately made a number of changes at Marquette, creating a new team image by increasing the significance of the team's media day and instituting a "Midnight Madness" event commonly held by schools on the night teams are allowed to begin practice.  Crean's first recruiting class was considered by experts to be among the top twenty in the country, Marquette's first in a long time.

In his nine years with Marquette, Crean's teams earned five NCAA Tournament bids, one more than the previous four Marquette coaches had in the 16 years prior to his arrival. During his tenure there Crean recruited, developed and coached a number of skilled players that made significant contributions in both the NCAA and NBA, including Dwyane Wade, Dominic James, Steve Novak, Wesley Matthews, and Travis Diener.

Over his final seven seasons at Marquette, Crean compiled an aggregate record of 160-68 (.702). The 2002-03 season was one of the best in Marquette history. The team made a Final Four appearance for the first time since winning the NCAA Championship in 1977. Crean has referred to the team's run as "one of the greatest four or five days of my life."

Later that year, Marquette accepted an offer to leave Conference USA for the Big East Conference after the 2004–2005 season. Big East commissioner Mike Tranghese cited his friendship with Crean as contributing to the invitation, saying, "That, to me, was one of the great appeals, to get Tommy as well as Marquette into the league."

Indiana University

On April 1, 2008, Crean was hired as head coach of the Indiana Hoosiers, succeeding interim head coach Dan Dakich. Dakich had replaced former coach Kelvin Sampson, who resigned after NCAA recruiting violations.  Between Crean's hiring and the start of the 2008–09 season, freshman Eric Gordon opted to leave early for the NBA and star forward DJ White graduated.  Two players kicked off the team by Dakich were not allowed back by Crean, one was dismissed by Crean and two transferred.  As a result, Crean began with a roster consisting only of two walk-ons who had scored a combined 36 points in their careers. Despite the long odds, Crean was known to approach games and practices as if Indiana could compete in each one and to continue stressing Hoosier Hysteria and the long tradition of success at the school.  He was well aware that he was walking into a difficult situation.  However, when asked why he left Marquette, Crean replied, "It's Indiana.  It's Indiana, and that is the bottom line."

With a depleted roster and damaged recruiting lure, Crean's first three seasons saw consecutive losing records of 6–25 (the worst in school history), 10–21, and 12–20. However, during this period Crean's recruiting classes progressively improved, most notably with the signing of five-star recruit and McDonald's All-American Cody Zeller, an Indiana native. Zeller was the highest ranked recruit to join the Indiana program since the Sampson era.

Despite his difficult early years at Indiana, Crean did much to establish goodwill with the fans. For instance, at the first "Midnight Madness" festivities before his first season, Crean brought back "Martha the Mop Lady," the subject of a popular ad that opened Hoosier basketball games on WTTV for 30 years. It featured a cleaning lady whistling "Indiana, Our Indiana" while cleaning Assembly Hall. Since the actress who had appeared in the original ads was unavailable, singer Sheila Stephen stepped in as the new Martha.  Starting with the 2010–11 season, video of the original ad was shown at home games after the National Anthem and right before tip off. Later, the video was shown just before the Hoosiers took the court.

The 2011–12 season was a watershed one for Crean and the program, which saw a 27–9 record and a sweet 16 appearance. The season also saw home wins over #1-ranked Kentucky (on a buzzer-beater at the end of regulation), #2-ranked Ohio State, and #5-ranked Michigan State. This made Crean the first Indiana coach to defeat the #1- and #2-ranked teams in the same season and the first Indiana squad ever to defeat three programs ranked in the top five in a single season. The Hoosiers earned a number four seed in the 2012 NCAA tournament and defeated New Mexico State in the Round of 64. After defeating VCU in the Round of 32, the Hoosiers lost in the Sweet Sixteen to rival Kentucky, who would go on to win the national championship.

The fifteen game win improvement in 2011–12 was the largest single turnaround in the NCAA that season. Crean's guidance of the program to success from "unthinkable depths" was widely regarded as one of the most remarkable rebuilding projects in NCAA basketball history. As a result, he was named the mid-season Jim Phelan National Coach of the Year, the Sporting News Big Ten Coach of the Year, and the ESPN.com National Coach of the Year.

For the 2012–13 season, Crean signed five highly touted recruits, self-dubbed "The Movement." Combined with the returning players from the previous season, Indiana dominated the college basketball landscape, spending 10 weeks ranked #1 in the country and all but two weeks in the top 5. The Hoosiers won their first outright Big Ten regular season title in 20 years, and garnered a #1 seed in the NCAA Tournament, also their first in 20 years. The team, led by seniors Christian Watford and Jordan Hulls, along with eventual top-five NBA draft picks Victor Oladipo and Cody Zeller, advanced to the Sweet Sixteen in the NCAA tournament before losing to eventual Final Four participant Syracuse. The next two seasons, 2013–14 and 2014–15, the Hoosiers slipped to records of 17–15 and 20–14 with eighth and seventh-place finishes in the Big Ten, respectively. Despite these low finishes and player arrests, Crean was retained after appearing on many media "hot seat" lists.  After a slow start to the 2015–16 season, Crean and the Hoosiers would eventually go on to be outright Big Ten Regular Season Champions and Crean was named by the coaches and media the Big Ten Coach of the Year. During the 2016–17 season, the Hoosiers missed the NCAA Tournament for the 5th time in 9 years under Crean despite being ranked #3 in the AP Poll earlier in the season and finished with an 18–16 record, losing in the first round of the NIT to Georgia Tech.

Crean was fired by Indiana on March 16, 2017.

University of Georgia
On March 15, 2018, Crean was named head coach of the Georgia Bulldogs. In Crean's four seasons, the Bulldogs went 47-75 overall and 15-57 in SEC play.

They went just 6-26 (1-17 in the SEC) during the 2021-2022 season. On March 10, 2022, Crean was fired by Georgia.

Coaching style and philosophy
Crean's basketball philosophy emphasizes fast breaks and deflections. On offense, he has a reputation for the magnitude of his offensive sets and their multitude of options, with one opposing coach estimating about 400 different sets run. Shot selection is extremely important, with a focus on spacing, inside-out attacks, penetration and kick. Crean utilizes the halfcourt defense which requires great ball pressure, help from teammates, challenging shots, and defensive rebounding.

Crean is considered an excellent recruiter and one of college basketball's best talent evaluators. A hallmark of Crean's programs is the notion that players are joining a family and making sure that players' families are involved in the program. Crean is also known to excel in public relations. At Marquette he began the tradition of Midnight Madness, which was seen as an immediate success. Between 1999 and 2006, Marquette saw a 70% overall increase in attendance, three total attendance records broken, and 1.5 million fans pass through the turnstiles.

On the court Crean is known to walk the sidelines with an intensity normally reserved for football coaches. For inspiration, Crean has a library filled with biographies of coaches and business executives, with favorites being Jim Collins' management guide "Good to Great" and the story of Bill Belichick's rise in New England, "Patriot Reign".

During his time at Indiana, Crean was criticized by fans and local sports media for the amount of turnovers his teams committed, poor defense, lack of team fundamentals, poor in-state recruiting, large numbers of players transferring, and his "blow-by" handshakes of opposing coaches.

Awards and recognition 
Crean has been chosen to coach a number of national teams. In 2001, he was selected by USA Basketball as one of eight coaches. In 2004, he served as an assistant coach for USA Basketball's under-20 team in the FIBA Americas World Championship. The team won its second title since the tournament.

Head coaching record

See also
 List of NCAA Division I Men's Final Four appearances by coach

Bibliography
Coaching Team Basketball. Wheaton, IL: McGraw-Hill, 2006. . (with Ralph Pim.)

References

External links
 Georgia Bulldogs bio

1966 births
Living people
Alma College alumni
Alma Scots men's basketball coaches
Basketball coaches from Michigan
Central Michigan University alumni
College men's basketball head coaches in the United States
Georgia Bulldogs basketball coaches
Harbaugh family
Indiana Hoosiers men's basketball coaches
Marquette Golden Eagles men's basketball coaches
Michigan State Spartans men's basketball coaches
People from Mount Pleasant, Michigan
Pittsburgh Panthers men's basketball coaches
Western Kentucky Hilltoppers basketball coaches